Andrew or Andy Irving may refer to:

Andrew Scott Irving (1837–1904), Scottish-born Canadian bookseller and publisher
Andy Irving (born 2000), Scottish footballer (Heart of Midlothian FC)
Andrew Irving (architect), Australian architect
Andrew Irving (curler) (fl. 2009–2018), curling player (2009 Safeway Championship)
Andrew Irving (lacrosse) (fl. 2011), lacrosse player (2011 Denver Outlaws season)